The Tasmanian darner, (Austroaeschna tasmanica), is a species of large dragonfly in the family Telephlebiidae, which includes some of the world's largest dragonflies. It is found in Tasmania, Australia. The species was first described by Robert Tillyard in 1916 and inhabits streams and rivers.

Also referred to as "hawkers", the name "darner" derives from the fact that the female abdomen looks like a sewing needle, as it cuts into a plant stem when the female dragonfly lays her eggs through her ovipositor.

The Tasmanian darner is a stout, dark dragonfly with a very dark colouring and light markings. It appears similar to the lesser Tasmanian darner, Austroaeschna hardyi.

Gallery

References

Telephlebiidae
Insects of Australia
Endemic fauna of Australia
Insects described in 1916